Alla Selina (born 5 January 1954) is a Soviet diver. She competed in the women's 10 metre platform event at the 1972 Summer Olympics.

References

External links
 

1954 births
Living people
Soviet female divers
Olympic divers of the Soviet Union
Divers at the 1972 Summer Olympics
Place of birth missing (living people)
Medalists at the 1973 Summer Universiade